This is a list of administrators and governors of Yobe State, Nigeria, which was formed in 1991-08-27 when it was split off from Borno State.

See also
States of Nigeria
List of state governors of Nigeria

References

Yobe
Governors